USS Opponent (AM-269) was an Admirable-class minesweeper built for the U.S. Navy during World War II. She was built to clear minefields in offshore waters, and served the Navy in the Atlantic Ocean and then was transferred to the North Pacific Ocean before war’s end.

Opponent was laid down 21 September 1942 by the Gulf Shipbuilding Co., Chickasaw, Alabama, launched 12 June 1943; sponsored by Mrs. H. Key, Jr.; and, commissioned 18 February 1944.

World War II Atlantic operations 
After shakedown along the Atlantic coast and in the Gulf Opponent departed Norfolk, Virginia, 12 April for Casco Bay, Maine. There she conducted antisubmarine exercises until she sailed for New York escorting , arriving Norfolk 29 April. Early the next month, Opponent's commanding officer was ordered to assume command of Mine Squadron 33 as well as to retain command of his ship. For the next year, the little minesweeper alternated between patrol work, type training and weather ship duties.

Transfer to the Pacific Fleet 
On 16 March 1945 she sailed for the Pacific. Arriving San Diego, California, on  5 April, Opponent was assigned to Mine Division 44. She departed San Diego three days later and arrived Pearl Harbor on the 13th. For the remainder of the war, Opponent escorted convoys between Southeast Asia and Pearl Harbor. She continued this service until early 1946, when she sailed to Orange, Texas.

Post-war decommissioning  
Opponent was decommissioned on 27 August 1946. She was reclassified MSF-269 on 7 February 1955. She was stricken from the Naval Vessel Register on 1 April 1960 and was sold to Ships & Power Inc., Miami, Florida, on 3 February 1961.

References

External links 

Admirable-class minesweepers
Ships built in Chickasaw, Alabama
1943 ships
World War II minesweepers of the United States